The International Federation of Operational Research Societies (IFORS) is an umbrella organization for national operations research societies of over 45 countries from four geographical regions: Asia Pacific, Europe, North America, and South America.

The organization was officially founded in 1959 by three organizations:  ORSA (United States), ORS (United Kingdom ), and SOFRO (France), although the first IFORS conference was held in Oxford in 1957.

The Statutes, set the purpose of the IFORS to be "the development of operational research as a unified science and its advancement in all nations of the world." An interesting aspect of the Statutes is that in formal votings of the Board the voting power of each member society is proportional to the square root of the qualified membership — thus giving the greater weight of the larger societies but not overwhelming the smaller societies.

References

External links
Summary of the IFORS archives, held at the Modern Records Centre, University of Warwick

Operations research societies
Organizations established in 1959